Middletown High School is a public high school located on Aquidneck Island in Rhode Island, United States. A part of Middletown Public Schools, it serves approximately 730 students from 9th through 12th grade and was established in 1961.

History
Sergeant Michael F Paranzino, class of 2006, was killed on 5 November 2010 by an improvised explosive device in Afghanistan.

The 2012 homecoming dance was shut down due to protests of an anti-grinding rule. Students began protesting and shouting profanities; the dance was abruptly ended by the Middletown superintendent, Rosemarie Kraeger.

Curriculum
The grading system operates on a 4.0 GPA scale, with a possible grade range of A (93-100) to F (<65). Course grades are reported on a quarterly basis, and the day to day schedule is block scheduled on a three-day cycle.

Coursework available
Students attending Middletown High School have a variety of classes available to them, ranging from career oriented classes such as Healthcare Science to advanced science and classes such as AP Chemistry, AP Biology and AP Calculus. There are also many options for students interested in humanities - MHS offers French and Spanish classes from entry level to Advanced Placement level as well as entry level and AP level history and English courses. MHS does not impose any prerequisites upon students, thus allowing any student wishing to challenge themselves the opportunity to do so. Despite lacking official prerequisites, students are often heavily discouraged from taking classes in an order that deviates from the standard.

Graduation requirements
 English - four years 
 Social Studies - three years 
 Mathematics - four years 
 Science - three years 
 World Language - two years (recommended)
 Art or Music - one semester/proficiency 
 Physical Education - four Semesters 
 Health - two Semesters
 Twenty hours of community service and a 500 word reflection letter
 Capstone project, presentation, and research paper

Extra curriculars
 Leo Club
 Band 	
 Math Team
 Best Buddies 	
 Mock Trial
 Chorus 	
 Harvard Model United Nations
 National Honor Society
 Drama Club 	
 Student Council 	
 FIRST Robotics Competition
 Unified Theater
 Unified Basketball
 Student Government
 CyberPatriot

U.S. News & World Report 2014 Silver Medal Award Winner

In 2014, Middletown High School was recognized nationally for its academic achievements. Middletown High School ranked number 1359 across the U.S. for its state rankings in mathematics and reading comprehension. College readiness is also a major determination factor that supports this report. Students were tested in each subject on a state proficiency exam. After the results were collected, Middletown High School was ranked one of the best high schools according to U.S. News & World Report.

Alumni
 Michael Flynn, former National Security Advisor of the United States (Class of 1977)
 Richard Hatch, winner of the first season of Survivor (Class of 1979)
 Charles A. Flynn, current lieutenant general in the US Army and Michael Flynn's younger brother (Class of 1981)

References

External links

 https://web.archive.org/web/20110824140812/http://middletown.patch.com/listings/middletown-high-school
 http://www.greatschools.org/rhode-island/middletown/133-Middletown-High-School/
 http://www.publicschoolreview.com/school_ov/school_id/71598

Schools in Newport County, Rhode Island
Public high schools in Rhode Island
Buildings and structures in Middletown, Rhode Island